Dame Priscilla Deborah Snowball, DBE, generally known as Cilla Snowball (born October 1958), is Group Chairman and Group Chief Executive of AMV BBDO, an advertising and communications group in the UK. She has worked for Abbott Mead Vickers for 20 years; in senior management positions since 2005, rising to agency head and now country head.

Career
After graduating from the Birmingham University in 1981 (BA, French), she moved straight into the world of advertising where she joined Allen Brady Marsh. In 1983, she moved to Ogilvy and Mather before leaving for Abbott Mead Vickers nine years later. There she moved up in the company, taking first  the post of Chief Executive, then Chairman in 2004 and Group CEO and Chairman in 2006.

On the board of BBDO Worldwide, Comic Relief and Birmingham University, she was appointed a CBE for services to advertising in 2009. She is Chairman of the Advertising Association.

Other activities

Corporate boards 
 Derwent London, Non-Executive Member of the Board of Directors (since 2015)
 RAC Limited, Non-Executive Member of the Board of Directors (since 2014)

Non-profit organisations 
 Genome Research Limited (GRL), Member of the Board of Directors (since 2019)
 Wellcome Trust, Member of the Board of Governors (since 2019)
 Women's Business Council, Chair (since 2016)

Recognition
In February 2013 Snowball was listed as one of the 100 most powerful women in the United Kingdom by Woman's Hour on BBC Radio 4. She was appointed Dame Commander of the Order of the British Empire (DBE) in the 2017 Birthday Honours for services to advertising, diversity, and equality.

References

External links
Financial Times - The Inventory: Cilla Snowball
Management Today - Friends in High Places
Photo of BBC Radio 4 Woman's Hour Power List 

1958 births
Living people
British advertising executives
Alumni of the University of Birmingham
Dames Commander of the Order of the British Empire
Place of birth missing (living people)
Date of birth missing (living people)